Zheng He (born November 1958) is a general (shangjiang) of the People's Liberation Army who served as president of PLA National Defense University from 2017 to 2021. He is a member of the 19th Central Committee of the Chinese Communist Party and was a delegate to the 12th National People's Congress.

Biography
Born in Shanghai, in November 1958, he graduated from Combined Arms Academy of the Armed Forces of the Russian Federation. He served in the Nanjing Military Region for a long time. His first assignment was chief of staff of the 31st Group Army followed by service at Nanjing Military Region as deputy chief of staff. He then received assignment as director of Military Training Division of the People's Liberation Army General Staff Department in 2013. In July 2015 he transferred to Chengdu Military Region as deputy commander. He was then assigned to the newly founded Training and Administration Department of the Central Military Commission as director in January 2016. One year later, he was appointed president of PLA Academy of Military Science, replacing Cai Yingting. He became president of PLA National Defense University in June 2017, serving in the post until his retirement in 2021.

He was promoted to the rank of major general (shaojiang) in 2009 and lieutenant general (zhongjiang) in July 2016. On 31 July 2019, he was awarded the military rank of general (shangjiang) by chairman Xi Jinping.

References

1958 births
Living people
Frunze Military Academy alumni
People's Liberation Army generals from Shanghai
Delegates to the 12th National People's Congress
Presidents of the PLA Academy of Military Science
Presidents of the PLA National Defence University
Members of the 19th Central Committee of the Chinese Communist Party